Zeba Bakhtiar (born 5 November 1962) is a Pakistani film/TV actress and a television director. She is known for her TV drama Anarkali (1988), the Bollywood romantic drama Henna (1991), and the Lollywood movie, Sargam (1995). She produced and directed a movie Babu in 2001. Zeba won the best actress Nigar Award for the movie Sargam in 1995.

Early life and family
Zeba is the daughter of Yahya Bakhtiar, a lawyer, politician and pre-independence Muslim League activist who served as the Attorney General of Pakistan, and also played a key role in framing Pakistan's current constitution. Her father belonged to Quetta, while her mother Eva Bakhtiar was an English woman born to Hungarian parents. Her father died in 2003, and her mother died in 2011. Her parents met in the UK in the early 1940s and married, with her mother eventually settling in Pakistan in 1949 after graduating from the University College London. Zeba has two brothers, Salim and Karim, who are both doctors, and a sister, Saira. She was raised in Quetta, and moved to Karachi later.

Career
Zeba made her television debut with a Pakistan Television drama, Anarkali in 1988. Her melancholic romantic role in Anarkali was widely appreciated. Then, she signed a Bollywood movie Henna in 1991 under the direction of Randhir Kapoor. Henna made Zeba a household name in the subcontinent. Later, she worked in more Bollywood movies like  Mohabbat Ki Arzoo (1994), Stuntman (1994), Jai Vikraanta (1995), and Muqadama (1996). But her career in Bollywood didn't make any progress after Henna. Then she came back to Pakistan and worked in Syed Noor directed film Sargam (1995). Her other Lollywood movies include Chief Sahib (1996), Qaid (1996), and Musalman (2001). She produced and directed movie  Babu in 2001, and produced a movie Mission 021 in 2014.
Apart from big screen, Zeba also appeared in some popular TV dramas like Tansan, Laag, and Pehli see mohabbat.

Personal life

Marriages
Zeba has been married 4 times. Her first husband was Salman Galliani whom she married in the year 1982. In 1989 she married Javed Jaffrey however denied this as rumours. Javed produced a Nikah Nama and the two divorced a year later. In 1993, Zeba came in the limelight because of her marriage to singer and music composer Adnan Sami. Zeba and Adnan got divorced in 1997. They both have a son named Azaan Sami Khan. Zeba then married Sohail Khan Leghari in 2008.

Diabetes
Zeba was diagnosed with diabetes before her second marriage. She now participates in the diabetes awareness campaigns on different forums.

Social work
She is involved in women's association football in Pakistan as chairwoman of Karachi-based Diya W.F.C.

Filmography

Television

Accolades
{|class="wikitable style"
! Ceremony 
! Category 
! Project 
! Result 
|-
| 3rd Lux Style Awards
| Chairperson's Lifetime Achievement Award 
| for her contributions to Pakistani entertainment industry 
| 
|-
| 5th Lux Style Awards
| Best TV Director (Terrestrial)
| Masuri| rowspan="2" 
|-
| 14th Lux Style Awards
| Best Film
| O21|}
 1992 - 37th Filmfare Awards - Best Actress - Henna (nominated)
1992 - 37th Filmfare Awards - Best Female Debut - Henna (nominated)
 1995 - Nigar Awards - Best Actress - Sargam'' (won)

See also 
 List of Pakistani actresses

References

External links
 

1962 births
Living people
People from Quetta
Actresses from Karachi
Pakistani film actresses
Pakistani television actresses
Pakistani people of British descent
Actresses of European descent in Indian films
Pakistani people of Hungarian descent
Kinnaird College for Women University alumni
Nigar Award winners
Actresses in Urdu cinema
Actresses in Hindi cinema
Pakistani expatriate actresses in India
20th-century Pakistani actresses
21st-century Pakistani actresses